is a passenger railway station in the city of Takasaki, Gunma, Japan, operated by the private railway operator Jōshin Dentetsu.

Lines

Station layout
The station consists of a single side platform serving traffic in both directions. There is no station building.

Adjacent stations

History
Sanonowatashi Station opened on 22 December 2014.

Surrounding area
Karasugawa River

See also
 List of railway stations in Japan

References

External links

 Jōshin Dentetsu 

Railway stations in Gunma Prefecture
Railway stations in Japan opened in 2014
Takasaki, Gunma